Eucumbene is a locality in the Snowy Monaro Regional Council in  New South Wales, Australia.

Geography 
The locality over looks Eucumbene Cove of Lake Eucumbene which is the impoundment of the Eucumbene Dam. The dam is part of the Snowy Mountains Scheme, a major Australian hydro-electricity and irrigation project.

History 
The locality was formerly known as Eucumbene Cove.
The former town of  Eucumbene (1953 to 1966) was located approximately 2.5 kilometres to the south-east.

Heritage listings 
Eucumbene has a number of heritage sites, including:

 Old Adaminaby and Lake Eucumbene

References 

 
Snowy Monaro Regional Council